Gibberella fujikuroi is a fungal plant pathogen. It causes bakanae disease in rice seedlings. 

Another name is foolish seedling disease. It gets that name because the seeds can be infected, leading to disparate outcomes for the plant. There are not many diseases that initiate similar symptoms as bakanae.

Hosts and symptoms 
Gibberella fujikuroi is most widely known for its disease producing capabilities in rice, but barley, millet, sugarcane and maize are also susceptible. In all infected plants, similar symptoms have been found, though rice has been most predominantly studied. The most telltale symptom of Bakanae is the tall, spindly look of the plant. This is a result of the gibberellins, or growth hormones, the fungus secretes. Infected plants are easy to pick out, then, as they often rise above the rest of the healthy plants with regularly secreted growth hormones.  However, it is also possible that stunting may occur, along with Chlorosis of the leaves of the plant, root lesions, or empty grains of plants grown to maturity.

Disease cycle 
Gibberella fujikuroi is a polycyclic ascomycete. Thus, it is possible to, at the right stage of the lifecycle of the pathogen, see perithecia or conidia under the microscope.  The pathogen overwinters in perithecia and will infect through soil in seeds that are not pre-infected. Infected seed is also a source of inoculum; conidia will germinate when planted. Infected seeds are the main way the disease is propagated. Symptoms can be observed during growing season.

Environment 
Bakanae is observed in all rice growing areas of the world. Thus, the pathogen thrives in the same growing conditions as rice. Rice requires a warm, wet growing season. Fields may even be flooded. The disease is known to be able to spread through water. Additionally, infected spores can be spread during harvesting. Thus, it is important to quarantine the infected seeds.

Management 
There have been many management solutions put forth, with the most important and widely used being the use of treated seeds. Growers should confer with the source of their seeds and as a second measure, check the weight of the seeds they receive. Lightweight seeds are typically infected. Seeds can also be treated to prevent pathogen activation. There are two options that have been found to be successful: hot water baths and chlorine treatments. However, one cannot be sure that the pathogen will be fully neutralized when subjected to these conditions.

Resistance in rice has also been studied. Specifically, the Binam cultivar has been found to be the most resistant to the disease, thus producing the largest yield in experiments when the disease was purposefully induced. Other varieties have shown partial resistance, but none as strong as Binam.

One new option that is under investigation for management potential is treating the seeds with silver nanoparticles. The particles are a known antifungal that are not toxic to humans. In one study, treatment with the particles reduced the incidence of the disease significantly.

Importance 
In rice crops, this disease has made a staggering economic impact. Losses have been specifically high in Asian countries, namely India, Thailand, and Japan. Specifically, Basmati rice has been a main target for Gibberella fujikuroi. At times, growers have lost up to 50% of their crop. However, rates of disease are not often so high and only occur during epidemic years.

Luckily, attempts at management have found success in the past and new treatments are continually researched. Growers can be confident that they will find an option to deal with this disease if it is present in their crop, if not initially, then hopefully by the next growing season.

Pathogenesis 
The pathogen induces excessive gibberellin production in the plant, resulting in the rapid growth of the hosts. The amount of Gibberellin is important in determining the extent of the disease. Another interaction between the plant and pathogen is the sporulation of mycelium at the lower levels of the plant - white fungal masses can be observed. Conidia, the secondary inoculum, are the end result of these spore masses.

References

External links 
 Index Fungorum
 USDA ARS Fungal Database
 Gibberella moniliformis, fusarium at MetaPathogen: stages, tissues, references

Fungal plant pathogens and diseases
Rice diseases
fujikuroi
IARC Group 2B carcinogens
Fusarium
Fungi described in 1931